Daniel Mendes Da Silva (born 15 June 1979) is a Paralympic athlete from Brazil competing mainly in category T11 sprint events.

Daniel competed in his first Paralympic Games in 2008 Paralympic Games where he won the B final in the 100m, fourth in both the 200m and 400m.  Four years later he competed in London in the 2012 Paralympic Games where he won his heat in the 100m and 400m but did not run in the semi-final and final respectively.  He was also a part of the Brazilian T11-13 that was disqualified but did earn the silver medal in 200m 0.02 seconds behind teammate Filipe Gomes.

References

External links
 

1979 births
Living people
People from Nova Venécia
Brazilian male sprinters
Paralympic athletes of Brazil
Paralympic gold medalists for Brazil
Paralympic silver medalists for Brazil
Athletes (track and field) at the 2008 Summer Paralympics
Athletes (track and field) at the 2012 Summer Paralympics
Athletes (track and field) at the 2016 Summer Paralympics
Medalists at the 2012 Summer Paralympics
Medalists at the 2016 Summer Paralympics
South American Games silver medalists for Brazil
South American Games medalists in athletics
Competitors at the 2010 South American Games
Paralympic medalists in athletics (track and field)
Medalists at the 2011 Parapan American Games
Medalists at the 2019 Parapan American Games
Medalists at the World Para Athletics Championships
Sportspeople from Espírito Santo
20th-century Brazilian people
21st-century Brazilian people